Edward J. Hoffman (? –October 30, 2014) was an American football coach. He served as the head football coach at Rensselaer Polytechnic Institute (RPI) in Troy, New York from 1958 to 1962. Hoffman was the athletic director at Briarcliff High School in Briarcliff Manor, New York from 1963 to 1988.

References

Year of birth missing
2014 deaths
RPI Engineers football coaches
Springfield College (Massachusetts) alumni